The 2018 Peach Bowl was a college football bowl game played on December 29, 2018. It was the 51st edition of the Peach Bowl, and the second Peach Bowl to be played in Mercedes-Benz Stadium. The game was one of the College Football Playoff New Year's Six bowl games, and one of the 2018–19 bowl games concluding the 2018 FBS football season. Sponsored by the Chick-fil-A restaurant franchise, the game was officially known as the Chick-fil-A Peach Bowl.

The game featured the Florida Gators of the Southeastern Conference and the Michigan Wolverines of the Big Ten Conference.  Going in to the bowl, Florida was the highest-ranked team that did not appear in the preseason AP top 25 poll. Michigan's defense had given up an average of 263 yards per game, the best in the nation.

Teams
The game featured the Florida Gators of the Southeastern Conference (SEC) and the Michigan Wolverines of the Big Ten Conference in their fifth meeting against each other. Michigan had won each of its prior games against Florida, most recently in the 2017 Advocare Classic by a score of 33–17.

Florida Gators

After finishing their regular season with a 9–3 record (5–3 in conference), the Gators were selected to their third Peach Bowl appearance. This was their 44th bowl game appearance.

Michigan Wolverines

After finishing their regular season with a 10–2 record (8–1 in conference), the Wolverines were selected to their first Peach Bowl appearance. This was their 47th bowl game appearance, tied for 11th-highest total all-time among FBS schools. Several Michigan players, including RB Karan Higdon, DL Rashan Gary, and LB Devin Bush Jr., sat out the game in order to focus on the 2019 NFL Draft.

Game summary

Scoring summary

Statistics

Note: 74,006 was the officially announced attendance figure; "turnstile count" subsequently reported as 68,413.

References

External links

Box score at ESPN

Peach Bowl
Peach Bowl
Florida Gators football bowl games
Michigan Wolverines football bowl games
2018 in sports in Georgia (U.S. state)
December 2018 sports events in the United States
2018 in Atlanta